Regency Enterprises (commonly referred to as Regency onscreen and copyrighting as Regency Entertainment (USA), Inc. in the U.S. and Monarchy Enterprises S.á.r.l. overseas) is an American entertainment company formed by Arnon Milchan. It was founded in 1982 as the successor to Regency International Pictures (formerly known as Embassy International Pictures N.V.).

History

Origins (1982–1991) 
Arnon Milchan founded his company as Embassy International Pictures N.V. which held the name for 7 years until the named changed to Regency International Pictures. This company originally had no distribution deal producing films with various studios such as The Ladd Company, Columbia Pictures, TriStar Pictures, Warner Bros., Touchstone Pictures, Vestron Pictures, Universal Pictures and 20th Century Fox. This company produced films such as Once Upon a Time in America and Q&A. This company was shut down in 1991.

Regency Enterprises and New Regency branding (1991–present) 
On January 15, 1991, Milchan and Regency, as well as Scriba & Deyle of Germany and Canal+ of France, formed a $600 million joint venture to finance 20 films in five years, all of which were to be distributed by Warner Bros. Arnon Milchan rebranded Regency International Pictures to Regency Enterprises. A subsidiary company, New Regency Productions, was also created. Formerly with offices on the Warner Bros. lot, New Regency is currently located on the 20th Century Studios lot. New Regency primarily produces movies, and has at least 100 movies to its credit. New Regency produced 2013's 12 Years a Slave, 2014's Birdman, and 2015's The Revenant, which earned the company two Academy Awards for Best Picture in a row, and three nominations.

Founder Arnon Milchan's daughter Alexandra Milchan headed their offshoot "Regency Vision", originally intended as a competitor to companies like New Line Cinema's Fine Line Features, a "specialty features" division.

On March 24, 1999, New Regency executive David Matalon joined the supervisory board of Puma AG, an international sports company. At the time, Regency was the largest single shareholder in Puma, with more than a 25% stake. Arnon Milchan also owned Puma stock, which he later sold for $676 million in May 2003.

On September 9, 1997, Milchan signed a 15-year distribution pact with 20th Century Fox worldwide in all media with the exception of foreign television rights, ending a previous association with Warner Bros. (1991–1999). Fox's then-parent company News Corporation funneled $200 million in New Regency, in exchange for a 20% stake in the company. On January 17, 2011, Fox and New Regency extended the pact, to expire in 2022. 

On May 21, 2008, they hired Hutch Parker as co-chairman of the studio. He left the post on January 11, 2012. In January 2019, New Regency re-formed its international sales team to take back control of its international television licensing activities. 

The Walt Disney Company inherited Fox's stake in Regency Enterprises and New Regency Productions after Disney acquired 21st Century Fox's assets on March 20, 2019. Following the acquisition, 20th Century Fox and Fox Searchlight Pictures became divisions of Walt Disney Studios and were renamed 20th Century Studios and Searchlight Pictures, respectively, on January 17, 2020, with distribution of films by Regency Enterprises transferred to Disney, in exchange for a 20% stake in the parent company. On December 13, 2021, New Regency renewed their global distribution deal with Disney. This includes Disney's handling of global theatrical distribution, home entertainment, and first pay rights for New Regency. New Regency's sales team, led by Charlotte Thorp and primarily based out of London, UK will handle all other television and SVOD rights after the first pay window as well as other business development.

New Regency Television International 
New Regency Television International (formerly known as Regency Television) is a joint venture between Regency Enterprises and Fox Television Studios founded in 1998. Regency's best-known television shows include The WB/UPN sci-fi drama Roswell and the Fox sitcoms Malcolm in the Middle and The Bernie Mac Show.

On July 17, 2007, Regency Television shut down all production and closed its business after nine years in operation. On January 17, 2011, New Regency announced a return to the television business after 20th Century Fox extended its distribution business with Regency until 2022. When New Regency re-formed its international sales team to take back control of its international television licensing activities in January 2019, Warner Bros. Domestic Television Distribution now handles domestic television rights to 1984's Once Upon a Time in America and the 1991–1999 Regency Enterprises library (except 1993's Six Degrees of Separation).

New Regency Television International launched at the start of 2019. Based out of London and drawing from New Regency's long-established relationships with the best writing, directing and producing talent, the division is focused on developing and producing high-end, authored and distinctive scripted content for the international marketplace.

Investments

Current 
 New Regency Productions (80%) (a joint venture between Regency Enterprises and 20th Century Studios)
 New Regency Television International (formerly known as Regency Television) (50%) (a joint venture between Regency Enterprises and 20th Television)

Former 
 Restless Records: Rock recording company, sold to Rykodisc in 2001.
 BabyFirst (30%): cable channel in U.S. aimed at 0–3 year olds, sold to First Media.

Filmography

Feature films

1980s

1990s

2000s

2010s

2020s

Upcoming

Television series

1990s

2000s

2020s

Upcoming

Television films/pilots

1990s

2000s

References

External links 
 

Companies based in Los Angeles
American companies established in 1982
Film production companies of the United States
1982 establishments in California
The Walt Disney Company subsidiaries
Former News Corporation subsidiaries